Standards Australia is a standards organisation established in 1922 and is recognised through a Memorandum of Understanding (MoU) with the Australian government as the primary non-government standards development body in Australia. It is a company limited by guarantee. As of 1998, it had 73 members representing groups interested in the development and application of technical standards and related products and services. The MoU recognises Standards Australia as Australia's representative on the International Organization for Standardization (ISO), the International Electrotechnical Commission (IEC) and the Pacific Area Standards Congress (PASC).

Standards Australia develops internationally aligned Australian standards (AS) and participates in standards-related activities. Standards Australia and Standards New Zealand work together to develop joint standards (AS/NZS).

Licensing of the sale of standards 
In 2003, Standards Australia sold its standards publication business and entered into a renewable contract giving the company SAI Global exclusive licensing rights to the sales of its standards, and SAI Global was floated on the Australian Stock Exchange. Initially, Standards Australia retained a 40% interest in SAI Global, but progressively sold this shareholding down to zero in order to focus exclusively on its core business of developing and maintaining its suite of approximately 7000 Australian standards and representing Australia's interests in international standardisation. The contract was further renewed through 2018. In 2016, SAI Global was acquired by Baring Private Equity Asia and delisted from the ASX.

As a result, in 2018 several groups including the Building Products Innovation Council, the Master Builders Association, an Australian Senate Economics Reference Committee and the Choice consumer advocacy organisation called for the publication rights to be brought under government control and for the standards to become freely accessible. Several groups advocated that a national standard should be provided free of charge to the relevant members of the industry. The publishing agreement currently held by SAI Global was due to expire in 2018, and the imminent release of the new AS/NZS 3000:2018 Electrical installations standard sparked a renewed campaign for a change of the licensing model.

Examples of notable standards 
 AS/NZS 1170 Structural design actions
 AS/NZS 5033 Installation and safety requirements for photovoltaic (PV) arrays
 AS/NZS 3000 Electrical installations (known as the Australian/New Zealand Wiring Rules)  
 AS/NZS 3112 Plug and socket outlets
 AS/NZS ISO 31000 Risk management – Principles and guidelines  
 AS/NZS 3500 Plumbing and drainage Set
 AS/NZS 3788 Pressure equipment – In-service inspection
 AS/NZS 1768 Lightning protection

See also
Builder broker

References

External links 

Standards organisations in Australia
Australia
Organizations established in 1922
Standards of Australia and New Zealand
Organisations based in Sydney